The 1997 Buffalo Bills season was their 38th in the league. The team failed to improve upon their previous season's output of 10–6, instead falling to 6–10. They missed the playoffs for only the second time in ten seasons. 1997 was Hall of Fame head coach Marv Levy's final year as the team's head coach.

Todd Collins started at quarterback for the Bills in their first season in the post-Jim Kelly era. The Bills also signed Oakland's Billy Joe Hobert to challenge Collins for the starting job. Third-string quarterback Alex Van Pelt also saw playing time with three starts in Collins' absence.

Hobert's contract was terminated after Week Seven, in which Hobert was backing up an injured Collins, and after the game revealed to the media that he had not studied the playbook. Hobert was released the next day.

One of the most memorable games in Buffalo Bills history occurred in Week Four against the Indianapolis Colts. The Colts roared to a 26–0 lead in the second quarter, before the Bills went on a 37–3 run, ultimately taking the lead 37–29 with 1:15 remaining in the game. The Colts closed to within two, but missed a two-point conversion, giving Buffalo a two-point victory. The game was the third-greatest regular season comeback in NFL history (third only to a 33-point comeback by the 2022 Vikings and a 28-point comeback by the 1980 49ers), and the second greatest in team history (second to "The Comeback" in the 1992 playoffs.)

Offseason 
Prior to the 1997 season, long-time quarterback (and future Hall of Famer) Jim Kelly announced his retirement from professional football. This left the Bills forced to find a different opening day starting quarterback for the first time since 1985. Third-year quarterback Todd Collins started the season, and the Bills signed former Raiders quarterback Billy Joe Hobert, whose contract was terminated after a Week Seven loss to New England.

NFL Draft 

One notable player that was not drafted by the Bills, but debuted for the team in 1997, was future Pro Bowl defensive tackle Pat Williams, who played with the team for eight seasons.

Roster

Schedule

Game summaries

Week 2

Week 3 

Starting QBs -> Buffalo Bills: Todd Collins (quarterback) / Kansas City Chiefs: Elvis Grbac

Vegas Line: Kansas City Chiefs -4.5 
Over/Under:	40.0 (under)

Standings

References 

Buffalo Bills seasons
Buffalo Bills
Buffalo Bills